Raymond Burns (born 8 October 1973) is a Northern Irish professional golfer.

Burns was born in Banbridge, County Down and turned professional in 1993 after representing Great Britain and Ireland in the Walker Cup. He missed out on qualifying for the European Tour at qualifying school at the end of 1993, and decided to play on the second tier Challenge Tour in 1994. He won twice during his rookie season and topped the Challenge Tour Rankings to secure his card on the European Tour for 1995.

Burns finished 8th on his European Tour début at the Dubai Desert Classic and maintained his place on the European Tour through the end of the 1998 season. A loss of form that season saw him return to the Challenge Tour in 1999, where he again struggled, failing to make the cut in any of his 11 starts.

After leaving the tour, Burns qualified as a teaching professional before attempting to return to tournament golf during the early to mid-2000s. Since 2006 has worked as the head professional at South County Golf Club.

Professional wins (2)

Challenge Tour wins (2)

Team appearances
Amateur
Jacques Léglise Trophy (representing Great Britain & Ireland): 1989 (winners), 1990 (winners), 1991 (winners)
St Andrews Trophy (representing Great Britain & Ireland): 1992 (winners)
Eisenhower Trophy (representing Great Britain & Ireland): 1992
Walker Cup (representing Great Britain & Ireland): 1993
European Amateur Team Championship (representing Ireland): 1993

References

External links

Male golfers from Northern Ireland
European Tour golfers
People from Banbridge
1973 births
Living people